The Woman with the Fan may refer to: 

 The Woman with the Fan (novel), a 1904 work by the British writer Robert Hichens
 The Woman with the Fan (film), a 1921 film adaptation directed by René Plaissetty